Caleb Elolo Adjomah (born May 27, 1988) popularly known as Giovani Caleb is a Ghanaian television personality and radio personality. As Master of Ceremonies, he has also hosted events including Ghana Club 100 Awards, MTN Hitmaker, the AFRIMA Music Village show (2018), 2019 Ghana Business Awards and the Vodafone Ghana Music Awards Red Carpet show.

Education 
Caleb completed his second cycle education at the Bishop Herman College and graduated from the University of Ghana with a bachelor's degree in Psychology and Linguistics. He also holds a Diploma (HRM) from the Institute of Commercial Marketers-UK.

Career 
Caleb started his career in the media industry on radio in 2008 with Radio Univers when he was in his second year in the University of Ghana. He joined Global Media Alliance and rose through the ranks to become the programs manager for YFM. He landed his first role as a TV presenter on Late Nite Celebrity Show on eT.V Ghana. He then moved to EIB Network's Live FM in 2015. He was the host of Starr Drive on Starr FM before leaving to join Media General's TV3 Network and host of 3FM Drive. He was later joined by Berla Mundi as a co-host..Giovani Caleb later became the host of Ghana's most popular show now 'Date Rush'.

The Giovani's prank game 
The Giovani's prank game is a prank call led by Giovani Caleb with assistance from Berla Mundi on the 3FM Drive which won the Best Radio Program of the Year at the 2019 RTP Awards. The game is targeted at siblings, celebrities and relationships. Notable victims include Joey B, Kwabena Kwabena, Naa Ashorkor, Ameyaw Debrah, and Israel Laryea.

Personal life 
Caleb is married to Belinda Boadu with kids.

Ambassador roles 
Caleb is the brand ambassador for Malta Guinness and a supporter of the UNCHR's Luquluqu Tribe. He also worked as a social media influencer of brands such as Jumia, South Africa Tourism, Hyundai Ghana and Infinix Note 7.

Awards and nominations

References 

University of Ghana alumni
Ghanaian television presenters
Ghanaian radio presenters
Place of birth missing (living people)
1988 births
Living people
Bishop Herman College alumni